The 2016 United States House of Representatives elections in New Hampshire were held on November 8, 2016, to elect the two U.S. representatives from the state of New Hampshire, one from each of the state's two congressional districts. The elections coincided with the 2016 U.S. presidential election, as well as other elections to the House of Representatives, elections to the United States Senate and various state and local elections. The primaries were held on September 13.

District 1

The 1st district covers the southeastern part of the state and consists of three general areas: Greater Manchester, the Seacoast and the Lakes Region. The incumbent was Republican Frank Guinta, who had represented the district since 2015 and previously from 2011 to 2013. He was elected with 52% of the vote in 2014, defeating Democratic incumbent Carol Shea-Porter, and the district has a PVI of R+1. However, in this election, the district narrowly flipped Democratic, making it the first time since 1854 that New Hampshire's congressional delegation was fully represented by Democrats.

Democratic primary

Candidates

Declared
 Shawn O'Connor, businessman
 Carol Shea-Porter, former U.S. Representative who held the seat from 2007 to 2011, and again from 2013 to 2015

Potential
 Martha Fuller Clark, state senator and nominee for the seat in 2000 and 2002
 Garth Corriveau, Manchester Alderman
 Tom Ferrini, former mayor of Portsmouth
 Travis Harker, physician and former president of the New Hampshire Medical Society
 Andrew Hosmer, state senator
 Terie Norelli, state representative and former Speaker of the New Hampshire House of Representatives
 Chris Pappas, executive councilor
 Stefany Shaheen, Portsmouth city councilor and daughter of U.S. Senator Jeanne Shaheen
 Donna Soucy, state senator

Results

Republican primary

Candidates

Declared
 Frank Guinta, incumbent U.S. Representative
 Pamela Tucker, New Hampshire State Representative
 Richard Ashooh, businessman

Withdrawn
 Dan Innis, Dean of the Peter T. Paul College of Business and Economics at the University of New Hampshire and 2014 candidate

Endorsements

Results

General election

Polling

Results

District 2

The 2nd district covers the western and northern parts of the state and includes the cities of Nashua and Concord. The incumbent is Democrat Ann McLane Kuster, who has represented the district since 2013. She was re-elected with 55% of the vote in 2014, and the district has a PVI of D+3.

Democratic primary

Candidates

Declared
Ann McLane Kuster, incumbent U.S. Representative

Potential
 Jim Bouley, Mayor of Concord
 Dan Feltes, state senator
 Jason Lyon, activist and businessman
 Steve Shurtleff, state representative
 Mike Vlacich, campaign manager for U.S. Senator Jeanne Shaheen
 Jeff Woodburn, state senator

Declined
 Colin Van Ostern, Executive Councilor (ran for Governor)

Results

Republican primary

Candidates

Potential
 Marilinda Garcia, former state representative, and nominee in 2014.
 Charles Bass, former U.S. Representative for this seat.
 Jack Flanagan, New Hampshire House Majority Leader.
 Gary Lambert, former state senator

Endorsements

Results

General election

Polling

Results

See also
 United States House of Representatives elections, 2016
 United States elections, 2016

References

External links
U.S. House elections in New Hampshire, 2016 at Ballotpedia
Campaign contributions at OpenSecrets

New Hampshire
2016
United States House